Leading Creek is a tributary of the Ohio River,  long, in southeastern Ohio in the United States. The creek's headwaters are in southern Athens County and it flows for most of its length in western Meigs County; its tributaries also drain a small area of northeastern Gallia County.

Leading Creek rises northwest of Albany in Lee Township in Athens County and initially flows southward into Meigs County, through Columbia Township, past the community of Carpenter; then southeastward through Salem, Rutland, and Salisbury townships, through the community of Langsville.  It flows into the Ohio River at the south end of the village of Middleport.

Little Leading Creek
Little Leading Creek is a tributary of Leading Creek and flows for its entire length in Meigs County.

See also
List of rivers of Ohio

References

Rivers of Ohio
Tributaries of the Ohio River
Rivers of Meigs County, Ohio
Rivers of Athens County, Ohio